Major General N Srinivas Rao, popularly known as, NS Rao,  was a General Officer Commanding of Telangana and Andhra Pradesh (TASA). He previously served as the Commandant of NCC Officers Training Academy, Kamptee. He is from the Regiment of Artillery and has commanded an Artillery Brigade.

Early life and education 
Rao is an  NDA Graduate. He was schooled at Wesley High School, Medak, Little Flower High School and Junior College, Hyderabad. He was commissioned in the Indian Army in 1981. He completed his MPhil from Devi Ahilya Vishwa Vidyalaya (DAVV University) and was a resident scholar at Pune University. Click here to convert into  Telugu

Military career 
Commissioned into the Regiment of Artillery, Rao has tenured instructional assignments four times in prestigious training establishments of the Indian Army. He has also been a research scholar in the Department of Defense and Strategic Studies at University of Pune.

He was appointed as Commandant of National Cadet Corps(NCC) Officers Training Academy, Kamptee in 2015. In the two years of his command, he instituted a number of reforms and measures to improve the curriculum and administration. He improved the quality of training and living conditions of more than 550 trainee teachers of NCC and permanent instructional staff of the three services deputed to the NCC.

He has been a passionate supporter of ex servicemen welfare initiatives. He has actively supported the e-pension Adalat of the PCDA(Pensions) Allahabad and urged ex servicemen to take fullest benefit of the Pension Adalat. As the General Officer Commanding TASA, he supported all the welfare activities being undertaken by the Telangana Government and assured full cooperation in ensuring the welfare of Ex-Servicemen and their dependents

Under his vision, TASA ECHS has shaped up by bringing the clientele satisfaction to 85% with automation and revolutionary ideas TASA ECHS commenced a synergised IT initiative called TEMIS for dedicated participation of all stakeholders, in order to make the scheme fully responsive to Ex-Servicemen and their dependents, TASA ECHS collaborated with Intellobots Technologies a software development startup, to leverage its cutting-edge technologies that would bring remarkable services to ECHS clientele. The IT initiatives enables all the veterans and their dependents to avail doctor appointment and many other ECHS facilities through mobile app 

After 38 years of meritorious service, Gen Rao superannuated on 31st August 2019.

Honours and decorations

Personal life 
He is married to Anuradha Rao. She has been involved in welfare and empowerment of families of service personnel.

References 

Year of birth missing (living people)
Living people
20th-century Indian military personnel
Indian Army officers